The 2011 Telavi Open was a professional tennis tournament played on clay courts. It was the fourth edition of the tournament which was part of the 2011 ITF Women's Circuit. It took place in Telavi, Georgia between 26 September and 2 October 2011.

WTA entrants

Seeds

 1 Rankings are as of September 19, 2011.

Other entrants
The following players received wildcards into the singles main draw:
  Ekaterine Gorgodze
  Olga Ianchuk
  Tatia Mikadze
  Elina Svitolina

The following players received entry from the qualifying draw:
  Alexandra Artamonova
  Anastasia Grymalska
  Elizaveta Ianchuk
  Andrea Koch Benvenuto

Champions

Singles

 Alexandra Panova def.  Alexandra Cadanțu, 4–6, 6–1, 6–1

Doubles

 Elena Bogdan /  Mihaela Buzărnescu def.  Ekaterine Gorgodze /  Anastasia Grymalska, 1–6, 6–1, [10–3]

External links
ITF Search 
Official site

Telavi Open
Telavi Open
2011 in Georgian sport